A rotating black hole is a black hole that possesses angular momentum. In particular, it rotates about one of its axes of symmetry.

All celestial objects – planets, stars (Sun), galaxies, black holes – spin.

Types of black holes 
There are four known, exact, black hole solutions to the Einstein field equations, which describe gravity in general relativity. Two of those rotate: the Kerr and Kerr–Newman black holes. It is generally believed that every black hole decays rapidly to a stable black hole; and, by the no-hair theorem, that (except for quantum fluctuations) stable black holes can be completely described at any moment in time by these 11 numbers:
 mass-energy M,
 linear momentum P (three components),
 angular momentum J (three components),
 position X (three components),
 electric charge Q.

These numbers represent the conserved attributes of an object which can be determined from a distance by examining its electromagnetic and gravitational fields. All other variations in the black hole will either escape to infinity or be swallowed up by the black hole. This is because anything happening inside the black hole horizon cannot affect events outside of it.

In terms of these properties, the four types of black holes can be defined as follows:

Note that astrophysical black holes are expected to have non-zero angular momentum, due to their formation via collapse of rotating stellar objects, but effectively zero charge, since any net charge will quickly attract the opposite charge and neutralize.  For this reason the term "astrophysical" black hole is usually reserved for the Kerr black hole.

Formation 
Rotating black holes are formed in the gravitational collapse of a massive spinning star or from the collapse or collision of a collection of compact objects, stars, or gas with a total non-zero angular momentum. As all known stars rotate and realistic collisions have non-zero angular momentum, it is expected that all black holes in nature are rotating black holes. Since observed astronomical objects do not possess an appreciable net electric charge, only the Kerr solution has astrophysical relevance.

In late 2006, astronomers reported estimates of the spin rates of black holes in The Astrophysical Journal. A black hole in the Milky Way, GRS 1915+105, may rotate 1,150 times per second, approaching the theoretical upper limit.

Relation with gamma ray bursts 
The formation of a rotating black hole by a collapsar is thought to be observed as the emission of gamma ray bursts.

Conversion to a Schwarzschild black hole 

 A rotating black hole can produce large amounts of energy at the expense of its rotational energy. This happens through the Penrose process in the black hole's ergosphere, an area just outside its event horizon. In that case a rotating black hole gradually reduces to a Schwarzschild black hole, the minimum configuration from which no further energy can be extracted, although the Kerr black hole's rotation velocity will never quite reach zero.

Kerr metric, Kerr–Newman metric 

A rotating black hole is a solution of Einstein's field equation. There are two known exact solutions, the Kerr metric and the Kerr–Newman metric, which are believed to be representative of all rotating black hole solutions, in the exterior region.

In the vicinity of a black hole, space curves so much that light rays are deflected, and very nearby light can be deflected so much that it travels several times around the black hole. Hence, when we observe a distant background galaxy (or some other celestial body), we may be lucky to see the same image of the galaxy multiple times, albeit more and more distorted.  A complete mathematical description for how light bends around the equatorial plane a Kerr black hole was published in 2021.

In 2022, it was mathematically demonstrated that the equilibrium found by Kerr in 1963 was stable and thus black holes—which were the solution to Einstein's equation of 1915—were stable.

State transition 
Rotating black holes have two temperature states they can exist in: heating (losing energy) and cooling.

In popular culture
Kerr black holes are featured extensively in the 2009 visual novel Steins;Gate (also TV / manga), for their possibilities in time travelling. These are, however, magnified greatly for the purpose of story telling.
Kerr black holes are also key to the "Swan Song"  project by Joe Davis (artist).

See also 
 Black hole bomb
 Black hole spin parameter
 Black hole spin-flip
 BKL singularity – solution representing interior geometry of black holes formed by gravitational collapse.
 Ergosphere
 Kerr black holes as wormholes
 Penrose process
 Ring singularity
 Stellar black holes

References

Further reading 

 

Black holes
Black hole